Moydodyr is a 1923 poem for children  by Korney Chukovsky about a magical creature by the same name. The name may be literally translated as "Wash 'til Holes", the common English translation is "Wash 'Em Clean".

The poem is about a small boy who does not want to wash. He gets so dirty that all his toys, clothes and other possessions decide to magically leave him. Suddenly, from the boy's mother's bedroom appears Moydodyr—an anthropomorphic washstand. He claims to be the chief of all washstands, soap bars, and sponges. He scolds the boy and calls his soap bars and sponges to wash him. The boy tries to run away, chased by a vicious sponge. The chase is described as happening on Petrograd streets. Finally they meet another recurring character from Chukovsky's books—the Crocodile. The Crocodile swallows the sponge and becomes angry with the boy for being so dirty. Scared by the Crocodile, the boy goes back to Moydodyr and takes a bath. The poem ends with a moralistic note to children on the virtue of hygiene.

Moydodyr character became a symbol of cleanliness in Russia and is often used to advertise detergents and other products.

There is a statue of Moydodyr in Sokolniki Park, Moscow.

References

External links
Nikolay Kalashnikov. Two Moydodyrs.  On the 1939 and 1954 cartoons "Moydodyr" drawn by same artist Ivan Ivanov-Vano.  Part 1, part 2.
 The English translation of the book on Web Archive

Works by Korney Chukovsky